Raymond J. DeMallie (October 16, 1946 – April 25, 2021) was an American anthropologist whose work focuses on the cultural history of the peoples of the Northern Plains, particularly the Lakota.  His work is informed by interrelated archival, museum-based, and ethnographic research in a manner characteristic of the ethnohistorical method. In 1985 he founded and became the director of the American Indian Studies Research Institute at Indiana University Bloomington, alongside Douglas Parks, whom he worked collaboratively throughout majority of his career to preserve and translate various Indigenous languages, after having first met in 1980. Shortly after Parks started to work with DeMallie at Indiana University Bloomington.  They got married in 2016.

Early life and education
Raymond DeMallie was born in 1946 and raised in Rochester, New York. In 1964, in his last year of high school, he attended the Lewis Henry Morgan Lectures at the University of Rochester, given by Fred Eggan of the University of Chicago.

This inspired DeMallie's decision to attend the University of Chicago for undergraduate and graduate work; Eggan would eventually serve as the chair of his dissertation committee.  Other influential teachers at Chicago included Sol Tax (with whom he worked as a member of the staff of Current Anthropology), George Stocking, Ray Fogelson, and David Schneider.

DeMallie's dissertation fieldwork on the Cheyenne River Indian Reservation focused on kinship and social organization.  DeMallie drew from both cultural and linguistic data, and he received his PhD in 1971. (He earned his B.A. with honors in 1968 and his M.A. in 1970, with the Department of Anthropology throughout his education at Chicago.)

Career
DeMallie was a member of the University of Wyoming's Department of Anthropology from 1972-73.

In 1973 he joined Indiana University's Anthropology Department, which allowed him to work with the department's founder, Carl Voegelin. In 1985 DeMallie founded and became the director of the American Indian Studies Research Institute at Indiana University.  The Institute collaborates with tribes to document endangered native languages and develop materials to teach the languages, many of which are being revived in tribal schools and colleges.  On the Indiana faculty, Professor DeMallie was also the Class of 1967 Chancellor’s Professor of Anthropology and American Studies.

During his career at Indiana, DeMallie has trained a significant number of scholars who have taken up research and teaching posts in several fields concerned with Native North American studies. These include Brenda Farnell, Paula Wagoner, Mindy J. Morgan, Jason Baird Jackson, and Carolyn Anderson.

DeMallie has been active in professional associations; in 1991-1992, he was elected as president of the American Society for Ethnohistory.

Legacy and honors
In 2002-2003, he was the French-American Foundation Chair in American Civilization at the École des Hautes Études en Sciences Sociales in Paris.

Representative works

Articles

Books

References 

1946 births
2021 deaths
American anthropologists
Linguists of Siouan languages
Indiana University Bloomington faculty
People from Rochester, New York